Falcutt (or Fancote) is a hamlet in the English county of Northamptonshire. With Astwell, it forms part the civil parish of Helmdon  and is south of the village of that name. Historically, Falcutt and Astwell were part of the Wappenham parish.

References

External links 

Hamlets in Northamptonshire
West Northamptonshire District